"Entertainment" is a song by French indie pop band Phoenix. It was released as the lead single from their fifth studio album, Bankrupt!, on 19 February 2013. It premiered a day earlier with airplay on BBC Radio 1's Zane Lowe show. Following the premiere, the single was sent to alternative radio, where it impacted in the United States during the week of 26 February. It was also featured on the soundtrack album of the 2013 American heist thriller film Now You See Me. "Entertainment" notably features a staccato guitar line and an array of synthesisers that culminate to form what some may describe as a slightly oriental-inspired sound. The official remix of the track features vocals from British R&B group Mutya Keisha Siobhan and re-worked production from Dev Hynes.

Music video
The music video, directed by Patrick Daughters, is shot in a cinematic style and is set in Korea. It features several characters interacting with each other throughout different historical periods. Its central theme is romantic with two people finding each other across the ages amidst conflict with antagonists. The band does not appear in the video.

In popular culture
The song is played during the end credits of the 2013 American heist thriller film Now You See Me and is included on its soundtrack. The song was featured in one episode of Catfish: The TV Show. It was featured on a T-Mobile ad in 2013.

Charts

Weekly charts

Year-end charts

References

Phoenix (band) songs
2013 singles
V2 Records singles
2013 songs
Songs written by Thomas Mars
Songs written by Laurent Brancowitz